Live is a live album released by the punk band Face to Face in 1998, recorded in Los Angeles in September 1997.

Track listing 
Walk the Walk
I Want
Blind
I'm Not Afraid
It's Not Over
I Won't Lie Down
You Lied
Ordinary
I'm Trying
Telling Them (Social Distortion cover)
Don't Turn Away
A.O.K.	
Complicated
Not for Free
Pastel	
Do You Care
Dissension
You've Done Nothing

Tracks 1, 3, 6, 8, and 13 originally recorded for Face to Face (1996)
Tracks 2, 4, 9, 15, and 17 originally recorded for Don't Turn Away (1992)
Track 5, 7, and 12 originally recorded for Big Choice (1995)
Track 11 originally recorded for Over It (1994)
Track 14 originally recorded for A Strange Compilation (1992)
Track 16 originally recorded for Rikk Agnew’s Smash Demos, Vol. II (1994)

References

Face to Face (punk band) albums
1998 live albums